The 2017 Skate America was the sixth event of six in the 2017–18 ISU Grand Prix of Figure Skating, a senior-level international invitational competition series. It was held in Lake Placid, New York on November 24–26. Medals were awarded in the disciplines of men's singles, ladies' singles, pair skating, and ice dance. Skaters earned points toward qualifying for the 2017–18 Grand Prix Final.

Entries 
The ISU published the preliminary assignments on May 26, 2017.

Changes to preliminary assignments

Results

Men 
Nathan Chen, skating with a left blade that had a nick in the outside edge, won the short program by a 15-point margin over Adam Rippon.

Rippon ranked first in the next segment, finishing 5.6 points ahead of Chen. Before skating, Rippon assisted in removing various insects on the ice. Having replaced the nicked blade, Chen stated, "I think that was a bad call. It was a little too sharp on the inside edge, and every time I pressed into it for sal(chow), toe and even flip, it would catch into the ice way harder than I was used to."

Kovtun withdrew due to a foot injury incurred during the short program and Samohin withdrew after dislocating his left shoulder when he fell on a quad Salchow. Rippon had some pain in his right shoulder after falling on a quad Lutz but was able to continue. Jin skated on two sprained ankles, but still achieved a free skate score and placement high enough to qualify for the Grand Prix final. Chen finished first overall by 9.43 points, Rippon won silver, and Voronov took bronze, with Rafael Arutyunyan coaching the top two.

Ladies 
Miyahara placed first in the short program, Sakamoto was second with a 1.32-point deficit, and Daleman third.

Miyahara, first in the free skate, won gold with a 3.44-point margin over Sakamoto, who won her first Grand Prix medal (in her second appearance on the senior series). Making her senior Grand Prix debut, Tennell rose from fourth after the short program to take the bronze medal. Wagner withdrew due to a skin infection on her ankle.

Pairs
Duhamel/Radford won the short program with a 1.7-point lead over Yu/Zhang.

In the free skate, Savchenko/Massot scored a personal best to win the title although Massot continued to be troubled by back pain. Yu/Zhang took the silver medal while Duhamel/Radford dropped to third.

Ice dance 
In the short dance, most teams received lower levels than they expected, with the exception of the Shibutanis, who scored a personal best and placed first with a 6.48-point lead over Cappellini/Lanotte.

The Shibutanis also ranked first in the free dance (by a margin of 6.14 points) and won the gold medal by over 12 points. Cappellini/Lanotte struggled with a lift but finished second overall and qualified to the Grand Prix Final along with the winners.

References

Citations

External links 
 2017 Skate America at the International Skating Union

Skate America
Skate America
Skate America